Social dumping is a practice of employers who use cheaper labour than is usually available at their site of production or sale, for example where production is moved to a low-wage country or area, or where poorly-paid migrant workers are employed. Employers thus save money and potentially increase their profits. Systemic criticism suggests that as a result, governments are tempted to enter a so-called social policy regime competition by reducing their labour and social standards to ease labour costs on enterprises and to retain business activity within their jurisdiction. There is a controversy around whether social dumping takes advantage of an EU directive on internal markets, the Bolkestein directive.

Gains and losses
Entities losing from social dumping:
 Employees in exporting countries
 Child labor in exporting countries
 Industry and environment in exporting country
 Government in exporting countries
 Employees in importing countries
 Shareholders of the company in importing countries

Entities gaining from social dumping:
 Companies in importing country
 Shareholders in importing country
 Customers in importing country
 Industry in importing market
 Employment in exporting country
 Government and investment in exporting country

Policy issues
A joint NGO statement on the EU Seasonal Migrant Workers' Directive also warns against social dumping. The document argues that a vague definition of seasonal work might fail to cover all types of seasonal employment taking place when the Directive exerts its otherwise-welcome protective measures on the labour market.

Marianne Thyssen, European Commissioner for Employment, Social Affairs, Skills and Labour Mobility, has noted that "there is no definition of the concept of "social dumping" in EC law".

See also
Dumping (pricing policy)
SUTA dumping

References

External links 
 European Union's Eurofound website: Social dumping
Cabinet veterans challenge ministers to address 'social dumping' - The Guardian newspaper (UK) Tuesday 3 February 2009
Social-dumping: a crisis in the UK Engineering Construction industry - Amicus website
Social Dumping Hypothesis Issues and Challenges GMTDC Business Training & Consultation

Anti-competitive practices
Offshoring
International trade
Pricing
Migrant workers